CHMT may refer to:

 CHMT-FM, a radio station
 Isoliquiritigenin 2'-O-methyltransferase, an enzyme